David Sobin is a well known American inventor, and the CEO of BAMnet Corporation, the parent company of ReplayLocker. A 24-year AT&T Executive, he led the team which created the first DSL (Digital Subscriber Line) product in the early 1980s and deployed it globally. While at Bell Labs, he was awarded a patent for his invention of a fiber optic backplane. He left AT&T/Lucent in 1996 to found his own DSL company, which was subsequently sold for approximately $50M in 1998. He holds BS and MS degrees in Electrical Engineering and Computer Science from NYU Polytechnic School of Engineering.

References

Polytechnic Institute of New York University alumni
Living people
Date of birth missing (living people)
20th-century American inventors
American businesspeople
Place of birth missing (living people)
Year of birth missing (living people)